A tehsil (also known as tahsil, taluka, or taluk) is a local unit of administrative division in some countries of South Asia. It is a subdistrict of the area within a district including the designated populated place that serves as its administrative centre, with possible additional towns, and usually a number of villages. The terms in India have replaced earlier terms, such as pargana (pergunnah) and thana.

In Andhra Pradesh and Telangana, a newer unit called mandal (circle) has come to replace the system of tehsils. It is generally smaller than a tehsil, and is meant for facilitating local self-government in the panchayat system. In West Bengal, Bihar, Jharkhand, community development blocks are the empowered grassroots administrative unit, replacing tehsils.

As an entity of local government, the tehsil office (panchayat samiti) exercises certain fiscal and administrative power over the villages and municipalities within its jurisdiction. It is the ultimate executive agency for land records and related administrative matters. The chief official is called the tehsildar or, less officially, the talukdar or taluka muktiarkar. Taluk or tehsil can be considered sub-districts in the Indian context. In some instances, tehsils overlap with "blocks" (panchayat union blocks or panchayat development blocks) and come under the land and revenue department, headed by the tehsildar; and blocks come under the rural development department, headed by the block development officer and serve different government administrative functions over the same or similar geographical area.

Although they may on occasion share the same area with a subdivision of a revenue division, known as revenue blocks, the two are distinct. For example, Raipur district in Chhattisgarh state is administratively divided into 13 tehsils and 15 revenue blocks. Nevertheless, the two are often conflated.

Background

India, as a vast country, is subdivided into many states and union territories for administrative purposes. Further divisions of these states are known as districts. These districts (jilla/zilla) are again divided into many subdivisions, viz tehsils or talukas. These subdivisions are again divided into gram panchayats or village panchayaths. Initially, this was done for collecting land revenue and administration purposes. But now these subdivisions are governed in tandem with other departments of government like education, agriculture, irrigation, health, police, etc. The different departments of state government generally have offices at tehsil or taluka level to facilitate good governance and to provide facilities to common people easily.

Nomenclature
In India, the term tehsil is commonly used in all northern states. In Maharashtra, Gujarat, Goa, Karnataka, Kerala and Tamil Nadu, taluka or taluk is more common. In Eastern India, instead of tehsils, the term Subdivisions are used in Bihar, Assam, Jharkhand and West Bengal, as well as large parts of Northeast India (Manipur, Meghalaya, Mizoram, Sikkim and Tripura). In Arunachal Pradesh and Nagaland, they are called circles.

Tehsil/tahsil and taluka/taluk and the variants are used as English words without further translation. Since these terms are unfamiliar to English speakers outside the subcontinent, the word county has sometimes been provided as a gloss, on the basis that a tehsil, like a county, is an administrative unit hierarchically above the local city, town, or village, but subordinate to a larger state or province. India and Pakistan have an intermediate level of hierarchy (or more than one, at least in parts of India): the district, also sometimes translated as county. In neither case is the analogy very exact.

Organization setup
Tehsildar is the chief or key government officer of each tehsil or taluka. In some states different nomenclature like talukdar, mamledar, amaldar, mandal officer is used. In many states of India, the tehsildar works as a magistrate. Each taluka will have an office called taluka office or tehsil office or tehsildar office at a designated place within taluka area known as taluka headquarters. Tehsildar is the incharge of taluka office. This is similar to district office or district collector at district level.

Throughout India, there is a three-tier local body/Panchayati Raj system within the state. At the top is the jilla/zilla panchayat (parishad). Taluka/Mandal Panchayat/Community Development Block is the second layer of this system and below them are the gram panchayats or village panchayats. These panchayats at all three levels have elected members from eligible voters of particular subdivisions. These elected members form the bodies which help the administration in policy-making, development works, and bringing grievances of the common public to the notice of the administration.

Nayabat is the lower part of tehsil which have some powers like tehsil. It can be understood as tehsil is the sub-district of a district, similarly, Nayabat is the sub-tehsil of a tehsil.

See also 
 Administrative divisions of India
 List of subdistricts in India
 Tehsil in Pakistan
 List of tehsils in Pakistan
 Taluqdar, a land holder and tax collector
 Tehsildar, a revenue administrative officer
 Village accountant

References

External links 
2001 maps provides maps of social, economic and demographic data of India in 2001

Types of administrative division
Urdu-language words and phrases
Hindi words and phrases